Dirwish Hanafi Darwish, better known as Darwish al-Asywti  (Arabic: درويش الأسيوطي). Dirwish (born August 6, 1946, in Hammamiya, Assiut Governorate, Egypt )  is a writer, poet, playwright, screenwriter and researcher in Egyptian folklore.

Education 
Dirwish received his Bachelor of Commerce from Ain Shams University in 1973, and he also obtained an MBA from Ain Shams University in 1974.

Career 
Dirwish started writing poetry since the preparatory stage, and began publishing in 1966 in Arab magazines and newspapers, including Al-Shier, Al- Hilal, October, Culture, Ibdaa Cairo, Al-Bayan and Al-Araby. He has also written radio skits and directed plays.  He also represented the Assiut National Theater Company and won the First Actor Award in 1971, then was appointed as a theater director in the popular culture in 1984. His works were presented at Al-Talia Theater, Youth Theatre, Al-Ghad Theater, the National Children's Theater in Cairo and the governorates, and the Qatari Dam Theatre.

Publications

Poetry collections 
      A song for Sinai (Original title: ughniat lisina), a joint poetry collection, about the Egyptian Book Authority, 1975
      Love in Exile (Original title: alhubu fi alghurbati), Poetry in Egyptian Colloquial, Special Publishing, 1985
      Gray song (Original title: ughniat ramadiatun), classical poetry, on the authority of the Egyptian Book Authority, 1987 
      From the Travels of the Heart (Original title: min 'asfar alqalba), Poetry in Classical, on the authority of Culture Palaces, 1994 
      From Seasons of Bad Time (Original title: min fusul alzaman alradi), poetry in classical Arabic, about the center of Arab civilization
      Songs for the morning (Original title: ughniat lilsabahi), poetry for the child, on the series Qatar Dew, Egypt, 1996
      Instead of Silence (Original title: badalan min alsamta), Poetry in Classical Arabic, On the Center of Arab Civilization, 2000 
      From the Conditions of the Lover Darwish (Original title: min 'ahwal aldarwish aleashiq), Classical Poetry, Egyptian Book Organization, 2003 
      A story about doves (Original title: hikayat ean alyamamu), poetry for the child, the book "Qatar Dew", Cultural Palaces Authority, 2003
      Instead of Silence (Original title: badalan min alsamta), Poetry in Classical, Family Library, 2004
      The Last Confession (Original title: aliaetiraf al'akhira), The Egyptian Book Organization, The Culture Palaces Authority, 2008
      The complete poetic works of Darwish Al-Asyouti (Original title: al'aemal alshieriat alkamilat lidarwish al'asyuti), The General Authority for Cultural Palaces 
      The Complete Poetic Works of Darwish Al-Asyouti: Part Two (Original title: althaqafa al'aemal alshieriat alkamilat lidarwish al'asyuti: aljuz' althaani), The General Authority for Cultural Palaces, 2012

Theatrical works 
      A dramatic investigation into an accident (Original title: tahqiq diramiun fi hadith earida), special edition, Upper Egypt Association for Arts and Letters, 1985
      In the authenticity of history(Original title: fi sihat altaarikhi), Association of Pioneers of the Palace of Culture in Assiut, 1985 
      Wedding Clip(Original title: eurs kilib), The Egyptian General Book Organization, Ishraqat, 1989
      He(Original title: hu), Poetic Play, Assiut Culture Branch, 2000
      The Deceiver(Original title: almukhadiei), a poetic play, Assiut Culture Branch, 2000
      Kidd Al-Basous (Original title: kayd albusus), The General Book Authority, 2002, New Ishraqat, 2003 
      The Sultanate's Dream(Original title: hulm alsaltanati), Text Guide 11, Culture Palaces Authority, 2003 
      Abu Ajour Sultan Hayer(Original title: 'abu eujur sultan hayar), Guide to Texts, Culture Palaces Authority, 2004

Periodicals and non-periodicals 
Summer's brutal party (Original title: haflat samar wahshiatun), Al Bayan Magazine, Kuwait, 1989
Mid-time dreams Al-Bayan Magazine (Original title: 'ahlam muntasaf alwaqt majalat albayani), Kuwait, 1989
Stranger Things (Original title:  'ashya' gharibat majalat 'aqlami), Aqlam Magazine, Sohag, 1990
Al-Madia (Original title: almaediat), a book on preparing leaders in youth and sports, 1992
The Deceiver (Original title: almakhadie), Theatrical Horizons Magazine, Culture Palaces Authority, 1992
The Prince's Horse (Original title: hisan al'amir), Leaders Preparation Book, Youth and Sports, 1993
The Leader of the Assassins (Original title:  zaeim alqatalat), Leadership Development Book, Youth and Sports, 1994
The Journey Through Distance Zero (Original title: alrihlat eabr almasafat sifr), Al Khaleej Newspaper, UAE, 1994, Dialogue, 1996
Abu Ajour Concert (Original title: haflat 'abu eujur afaq almasrahi), Horizons of the Theatre, Culture Palaces Authority, 1998
The Good News for the Child (Original title: albisharat liltifli), Buds of Faith, Issue 185
The Poetry of the Pregnant Prince of the Child (Original title: shaear al'amir alhamil liltifli), Buds of Faith, Issue 193
The Reward of the Envy of the Child (Original title: jaza' alhasid liltifla), Buds of Faith, Issue 222
The judge's wisdom for the child (Original title: hikmat alqadi liltifla), Buds of Faith, Issue 239
Princess Umm Bilal for the child (Original title: al'amirat 'am bilal liltifla), the buds of faith
The Return of the Prisoner to the Child (Original title: eawdat al'asir liltifli), Buds of Faith, Issue 339

Studies and popular literature: 

 Playing the Children: Popular Studies Library Series, Culture Palaces Authority, 2002 
 The role of folklore in education: an article, Turath magazine, Emirates, December 2002
 From the songs of the cradle: Book, Library of Popular Studies Series, Cultural Palaces Authority, 2003
 Forms of the many in Upper Egypt: A book, Folk Studies, Culture Palaces Authority, 2006  
 The popular joys of Upper Egypt: From rituals and texts for celebrations of marriage, pregnancy, childbirth, and circumcision, The Egyptian General Book Organization, 2012  
 Singing farmers in Upper Egypt, The General Authority for Cultural Palaces, 2016  
 Crimes of novel, robbery, and interpretation of folk songs in Upper Egypt, General Egyptian Book Organization, 2018
 Notes on the interpretation of the vocabulary of folk songs in Upper Egypt, a study, Journal of Folklore, Egypt
 From Pictures of Women in One Thousand and One Nights: A Study, Al Mohit Al Thaqafi Journal, Egypt
 Pregnancy, Childbirth and Circumcision: On Arabic Books Website, electronic publication
 Popular Joy: on Arabic Books website, electronic publication

Novels:

 Userkaf.. The Eternity Papyrus, Dar Al-Hilal, 2006

21st-century Egyptian writers

Awards 

 A certificate of appreciation from the mass culture of my two plays: In the Truth of History and Waiting for Adam. 1982
 Third place in the children's theater competition in the International Center for Theater competition, 1983
 The second prize from the popular culture, 1984, for the play "A Darkness Case"
 First place in theatrical composition, competition of Jizan Club, Saudi Arabia, 1990
 The second prize from the National Center for the Child, 1990, for the play A Boy and a Lion
 The first prize from preparing the leaders for the play Al-Madiya, 1993
 First prize prepared by leaders, 1994, for the play The Prince's Horse
 First prize prepared by leaders, 1995, for the play "Leader of Assassins"
 State Incentive Award in Poetry, 1997
 Shield of the Egyptian Association for Theater Amateurs, 1998, for his role in writing for the child
 Best Play Award in Regional Publishing, Short Plays, 2001
 First Prize of Ahmed Bakathir Theatrical Competition, 2007

References 

21st-century Egyptian writers
20th-century Egyptian writers
1946 births
Living people